Haplocheirus is a genus of theropod dinosaur. Upon its description, it was considered the oldest alvarezsauroid, predating all other members by about 63 million years. This has subsequently been questioned. A 2019 study considered Haplocheirus a compsognathid instead of an alvarezsauroid, while a 2022 study considered it to have more similarities with ornithomimosaurs. Haplocheirus was described in 2010 from a fossil specimen found from the 160-million-year-old  Shishugou Formation in the Junggar Basin of northwestern China. The type species is H. sollers, meaning "simple-handed skillful one", referencing its hypothesized behavior of using its three-fingered hands for activities that other alvarezsauroids could not perform, such as catching prey.

Description

Haplocheirus had an enlarged thumb claw like alvarezsaurids, but also retained two other functional fingers, unlike alvarezsaurids, where only the thumb was significantly large and clawed. It had long legs and was probably a fast runner.  It had large pupils for proportional for an animal its size.

According to one study, it and the alvarezsaurid Shuvuuia were likely nocturnal animals.

See also

 2010 in paleontology
 List of dinosaurs

Footnotes

References

External links
Richard Stone Bird-Dinosaur Link Firmed Up, And in Brilliant Technicolor Science 29 January 2010: Vol. 327. no. 5965, p. 508, DOI 10.1126/science.327.5965.508
Doreen Walton New dinosaur discovery solves evolutionary bird puzzle BBC News Thursday, 28 January 2010

Alvarezsaurs
Monotypic dinosaur genera
Oxfordian life
Late Jurassic dinosaurs of Asia
Jurassic China
Fossils of China
Paleontology in Xinjiang
Fossil taxa described in 2010